The Windberg (353 m above NN) is a hill in the borough of Freital near Dresden in the German federal state of Saxony. It is the town's Hausberg or local hill.

Geomorphology and natural features 
The Windberg has a striking silhouette, visible from afar. Its narrow northwestern slope opens out into a long, broad and thickly wooded plateau. The hill has been designated as a nature reserve and protected area since 1967 due to its near-natural woodland and rich flora and fauna.

Gallery

References

Sources 
 Haus der Heimat Freital (Hg.): Der Windberg, Freital 1986

External links 

 Information about the Windberg

Freital
Hills of Saxony
Nature reserves in Saxony
Protected landscapes in Germany